Fred V. Murphy II A.S.C. is a New York-based cinematographer who has worked on over 50 movies, among them such films as Hoosiers, The Dead, Secret Window, Auto Focus and The Mothman Prophecies. In 2006 he shot the US boxoffice hit RV, starring Robin Williams, and in 2007 the indie thriller Anamorph with Willem Dafoe. He worked as a gaffer for commercials before becoming a cinematographer.

Filmography
1969 - Submission
1976 - Not a Pretty Picture
1977 - Local Color
1978 - The Scenic Route; Girlfriends
1979 - Heartland
1980 - Imposters; The Ghost Dance; Tell Me a Riddle
1982 - Q; Der Stand der Dinge
1983 - Eddie and the Cruisers; Touched
1985 - Death of an Angel; Key Exchange; The Trip to Bountiful
1985 - A Time to Live
1986 - Hoosiers
1987 - Winners Take All; Five Corners; Best Seller; The Dead
1988 - Fresh Horses; Full Moon in Blue Water
1989 - Night Game; Enemies: A Love Story
1990 - Funny About Love
1991 - Scenes from a Mall
1993 - Jack the Bear; The Pickle
1995 - Murder in the First
1996 - A Family Thing; Faithful
1997 - Metro
1998 - Dance with Me
1999 - October Sky; Stir of Echoes; Witness Protection
1999 - Hypnose
2000 - The Fantasticks
2001 - Soul Survivors
2002 - The Mothman Prophecies; Auto Focus; Cheats
2003 - Freddy vs. Jason
2004 - Secret Window
2005 - Dreamer: Inspired by a True Story
2006 - RV
2007 - Anamorph
2008 - Drillbit Taylor
2009 - The Good Wife (television series)

References

External links
 

1942 births
Living people
American cinematographers
People from New York (state)